Thrive is the ninth studio album by Christian pop rock band Newsboys, released in 2002. It features the singles "It Is You", "Million Pieces (Kissin' Your Cares Goodbye)", and "Lord (I Don't Know)". Thrive debuted at No. 38 on the Billboard 200 chart, selling 37,000 units. In 2005, Thrive – Special Edition was bundled with the previously released From the Rock and Roll Hall of Fame and Museum concert DVD. When it was pre-ordered it came with the exclusive It Is You EP.

Track listing

Music Videos
 "Million Pieces (Kissin' Your Care Goodbye)"

Radio singles
"It Is You"
"Million Pieces (Kissin' Your Cares Goodbye)"
"The Fad of the Land"
"John Woo"

Thrive: From The Rock 'N' Roll Hall of Fame
Thrive: From The Rock 'N' Roll Hall of Fame was released to DVD 18 June 2002. It was available in Thrive Limited Edition in 2005.
"Giving it Over"
"Live in Stereo"
"Who" – from Shine: The Hits
"Rescue"
"Million Pieces (Kissin' Your Cares Goodbye)"
"It is You"
"Entertaining Angels" – from Step Up to the Microphone
"Joy" – from Shine: The Hits
"The Fad of the Land"
"Take Me to Your Leader" – from Take Me to Your Leader
"Thrive"
"Shine" – from Going Public
"Breakfast" – from Take Me to Your Leader
"Lord (I Don't Know)"

Airplay
According to Mediabase, the songs that have received the most spins on airplay (as of August 2007) are as follows, from greatest to least: "It Is You" (38,963 spins), "Million Pieces (Kissin' Your Cares Goodbye)" (28,815 spins), "Lord (I Don't Know)" (141 spins), "John Woo" (78 spins), "Cornelius" (43 spins), "Live in Stereo" (7 spins), "Rescue" (6 spins), "The Fad of the Land" (5 spins), "Giving It Over" (5 spins), and "Thrive" (2 spins).

"Live in Stereo" was featured in the console version of Disney's Extreme Skate Adventure.

Personnel 
Newsboys
 Peter Furler – lead vocals, guitars, drums
 Phil Joel – bass guitar, guitars, backing vocals
 Jody Davis – guitars, backing vocals
 Jeff Frankenstein – keyboards, programming
 Duncan Phillips – drums, percussion

Additional musicians

 Jeff Coffin – baritone saxophone (1)
 Eric Darken – drum corps (2, 7), percussion (2, 7)
 Dan Rudin – vocoder (5), congas (5), additional percussion (7)
 Robert Marvin – additional programming (9)
 Chanel Campbell – chanting on "Cornelius"
 Gabrielle Campbell – bridge chorus on "Live in Stereo"
 Simone Campbell – chanting on "Cornelius"
 Bethany Davis – chanting on "Cornelius"
 Amy Frankenstein – chanting on "Cornelius"
 Debbie Furler – chanting on "Cornelius"
 Summer Furler – chanting on "Cornelius"
 Michelle Keil – bridge chorus on "Live in Stereo"
 Alice Nolte – bridge chorus on "Live in Stereo"
 Breeon Phillips – chanting on "Cornelius"
 Heather Urry – chanting on "Cornelius"
 Tina – chanting on "Cornelius"
 The Campbell Clan – chanting on "Cornelius"
 The Keil Camp – chanting on "Cornelius"
 The Nolte Nippers – chanting on "Cornelius"

Production

 Peter Furler – producer 
 Steve Taylor – producer (1–5, 7–10)
 Joe Baldridge – additional production, engineer, mixing (2, 6, 9, 10), producer (6)
 Wes Campbell – executive producer 
 Lynn Nichols – executive producer 
 Russ Long – engineer 
 Dan Rudin – engineer 
 Richie Biggs – additional engineer 
 Joe Costa – additional engineer, assistant engineer, mix assistant (2, 6, 9, 10)
 Dan Leffler – additional engineer, assistant engineer, mix assistant (2, 6, 9, 10)
 Terence Dover – assistant engineer 
 Leslie Richter – assistant engineer 
 Todd Wells – assistant engineer 
 Tom Lord-Alge – mixing (1, 3, 4, 5, 7, 8)
 Femio Hernandez – mix assistant (1, 3, 4, 5, 7, 8)
 Kevin Pickle – mix assistant (2, 6, 9, 10)
 Bob Ludwig – mastering at Gateway Mastering, Portland, Maine
 Christiév Carothers – creative director 
 Jan Cook – art direction 
 Buddy Jackson – art direction
 Linda Bourdeaux – design 
 Jennifer Kemp – stylist, wardrobe
 David Dobson – photography 

Studios
 Bridge Street Studios, Franklin, Tennessee – recording studio
 Dark Horse Recording Studio, Franklin, Tennessee – recording studio
 The Sound Kitchen, Franklin, Tennessee – recording studio, mixing location
 Ocean Way Recording, Hollywood, California – recording studio
 South Beach Studios, Miami Beach, Florida – mixing location
 Recording Arts, Nashville, Tennessee – mixing location

References

External links
It Is You performed live

2002 albums
Newsboys albums
Sparrow Records albums